Wild celery is a common name for several plants. It can refer to:

 Wild growing forms of celery, Apium graveolens
 Angelica archangelica, cultivated as a vegetable and medicinal plant
 Lovage, Levisticum officinale, sometimes known as wild celery
 Trachyspermum roxburghianum, a plant used as a spice in South and Southeast Asia
 Vallisneria americana, an aquatic plant in the family Hydrocharitaceae

See also
Indian celery